Fua Logo Tavui (born 23 July 1952 in Santa Clara, California) is a sailor who represented American Samoa.

Tavui competed at the 1996 Summer Olympics, he was the crewman in the Star Class with Robert Lowrance as his skipper, after 10 races the pair finished 24th out 25 starters.

References

External links
 

1952 births
Living people
American male sailors (sport)
American sportspeople of Samoan descent
Olympic sailors of American Samoa
Sailors at the 1996 Summer Olympics – Star
Sportspeople from Santa Clara, California